Charles Hitchcock may refer to:

 Charles B. Hitchcock (died 1875), American politician
 Charles Henry Hitchcock (1836–1919), American geologist
 Charles Leo Hitchcock (1902–1986), American botanist